Events from the year 1785 in art.

Events
Joseph Wright of Derby holds a one-man exhibition in London, having severed his official connection with the Royal Academy.

Works

Nicolas Benjamin Delapierre – Portrait of a Seated Gentleman
Joseph Duplessis – Portrait of Benjamin Franklin (approximate date)
Thomas Gainsborough
Mr and Mrs William Hallett ('The Morning Walk')
Portrait of Mrs. Sarah Siddons
Anton Graff – Self-portrait with his family
Hugh Douglas Hamilton – Lord Edward Stuart
Jean-Antoine Houdon – Portrait bust of George Washington
Adélaïde Labille-Guiard – Self-portrait with two pupils
Jacques-Antoine-Marie Lemoine – Portrait of Zamor
Isidro Lorea – Main altarpiece of Buenos Aires Metropolitan Cathedral (carved wood)
Sir Joshua Reynolds – approximate date
Miss Theophila Gwatkin as Simplicity
Emma Hart as a Bacchante
George Romney – At least two portraits of Emma Hart
Alexander Roslin – Self Portrait while Painting the King of Sweden
George Stubbs – Haymakers and Reapers (Tate Britain)

Births
January 8 – Jan Baptiste de Jonghe, Belgian landscape painter (died 1844)
April 26 – John James Audubon, Haitian-born American naturalist and painter (died 1851)
September 1 – José Gil de Castro, Afro-Peruvian painter especially of portraits of Peru's heroes (died c. 1841)
September 26 – Charles Bird King, American portrait artist who notably paints Native American delegates visiting Washington, D.C. (died 1862)
October 12 – Henry Thomas Alken, English engraver, illustrator and sporting artist (died 1851)
October 31 – Georg Friedrich Kersting, German painter of Biedermeier-style interior paintings (died 1847)
November 18 – David Wilkie, Scottish painter and engraver (died 1841)
December 1 – Abraham Constantin,  Swiss enamel painter (died 1851)
December 23 – Christian Gobrecht, American engraver (died 1844)
December 30 – Edouard Pingret, French painter and lithographer (died 1869)
date unknown
Pál Balkay, Hungarian painter and teacher (died 1846)
Daniel Havell, English engraver (died 1822)
Ignatius Josephus van Regemorter, Flemish historical, landscape and genre painter and engraver (died 1873)
probable – Bernardo Consorti,  Italian line-engraver (died unknown)

Deaths
 January 2 – Andrés de la Calleja, Spanish painter (born 1705)
 April 13 – Michel-François Dandré-Bardon, French historical painter and etcher (born 1700)
 May 8 – Pietro Longhi, Venetian painter (born 1701)
 August 20 – Jean-Baptiste Pigalle, French sculptor (born 1714)
 October 4 – Alexander Runciman, Scottish painter (born 1736)
 October 19 – Hugues Taraval, French painter (born 1729)
 December 14 – Giovanni Battista Cipriani, Italian painter and engraver (born 1727)
 date unknown
 John Hodges Benwell, English genre painter (born 1764; consumption)
 Johannes de Bosch, Dutch painter, engraver and draughtsman (born 1713)
 William Cochran, Scottish painter (born 1738)
 Pietro Gaspari, Italian artist, known for veduta and capriccio in etchings and paintings (born 1720)
 Jacques Fabien Gautier d'Agoty, French painter and printmaker (born 1716)
 José Luzán, Spanish Baroque painter (born 1710)
 Krzysztof Perwanger, Polish sculptor and mayor (born 1700)

References

 
Years of the 18th century in art
1780s in art